The Clonin Earthworks, also called the Bull Ring, are a series of earthworks, and a National Monument, located in County Offaly, Ireland.

Location

The Clonin Earthworks are located on Clonin Hill, between the Monagh River and the Yellow River. They are 800 m (½ mile) west of Rhode.

Description

This barrow is composed of a circular, flat-topped mound enclosed by an inner fosse, surrounded by a fence. The stone and earth bank and the inner ditch are quite well preserved, though partially destroyed in the northeast corner.

References

National Monuments in County Offaly